Brucklay railway station was a former railway station in Brucklay, Aberdeenshire.

History 
The station was opened on 24 April 1865 by the Formartine and Buchan Railway. On the northbound platform was the station building on the west side was the goods yard and on the north end of the northbound platform was the signal box, which opened in 1891. It closed in 1959 and was replaced by a ground frame. The station closed on 4 October 1965 and closed to goods on 28 March 1966.

References

Sources
 
 
 RAILSCOT on Formartine and Buchan Railway

Disused railway stations in Aberdeenshire
Beeching closures in Scotland
Former Great North of Scotland Railway stations
Railway stations in Great Britain opened in 1865
Railway stations in Great Britain closed in 1965
1865 establishments in Scotland
1965 disestablishments in Scotland